Stasimopus mandelai is a species of spider in the family Stasimopidae from the Eastern Cape Province of South Africa. This species occurs syntopically with S. schoenlandi and a number of other mygalomorph spiders at the Great Fish River Nature Reserve. The species was named in 2004 by zoologists Brent Hendrixson and Jason Bond "honoring Nelson Mandela, the former president of South Africa and one of the great moral leaders of our time."

See also
List of organisms named after famous people (born 1900–1949)
Anelosimus nelsoni

References

Endemic fauna of South Africa
Stasimopidae
Nelson Mandela
Spiders described in 2004
Spiders of South Africa